A gold coin is a coin that is made mostly or entirely of gold. Most gold coins minted since 1800 are 90–92% gold (22karat), while most of today's gold bullion coins are pure gold, such as the Britannia, Canadian Maple Leaf, and American Buffalo. Alloyed gold coins, like the American Gold Eagle and South African Krugerrand, are typically 91.7% gold by weight, with the remainder being silver and copper.

Traditionally (up to about the 1930s), gold coins have been circulation coins, including coin-like bracteates and dinars. In recent decades, however, gold coins are mainly produced as bullion coins for investors and as commemorative coins for collectors. While modern gold coins are still legal tender, they are not observed in everyday financial transactions, as the metal value normally exceeds the nominal value. For example, the American Gold Eagle has a denomination of 10 USD, but a metal value of more than $800 USD (being around a half an ounce).

The gold reserves of central banks are dominated by gold bars, but gold coins may occasionally contribute.

Gold has been used as money for many reasons. It is fungible, with a low spread between the prices to buy and sell. Gold is also easily transportable, as it has a high value-to-weight ratio compared to other commodities such as silver. Gold can be re-coined, divided into smaller units, or melted into larger units such as gold bars, without destroying its metal value. The density of gold is higher than most other metals, making it difficult to pass counterfeits. Additionally, gold is extremely unreactive chemically: it does not tarnish or corrode over time.

History

Antiquity

Gold was used in commerce (beside other precious metals) in the Ancient Near East since the Bronze Age, but coins proper originated much later, during the 6th century BC, in Anatolia. The name of king Croesus of Lydia remains associated with the invention (although the Parian Chronicle mentions Pheidon of Argos as a contender). In 546 BC, Croesus was captured by the Persians, who adopted gold as the main metal for their coins. The most valuable of all Persian minted coinage still remains the gold drams, minted in 1 AD as a gift by the Persian King Vonones (Matthew 2.1–23).  Ancient Greek coinage contained a number of gold coins issued by the various city states.

The Ying yuan is an early gold coin minted in ancient China. The oldest ones known are from about the 5th or 6th century BC.

Larger units such as the various talent measures (26 to up to 60 kg) were used for high value exchanges (similar to today's 400-troy-ounce (12.4 kg) "good delivery" gold bullion bar).

Middle Ages and Early Modern period

Modern history
The German gold mark was introduced in 1873 in the German Empire, replacing the various local Gulden coins of the Holy Roman Empire.

Gold coins then had a very long period as a primary form of money, only falling into disuse in the early 20th century. Most of the world stopped making gold coins as currency by 1933, as countries switched from the gold standard due to hoarding during the worldwide economic crisis of the Great Depression. In the United States, 1933's Executive Order 6102 forbade the hoarding of gold and was followed by a devaluation of the dollar relative to gold, although the United States did not completely uncouple the dollar from the value of gold until 1971.

Gold-colored coins have made a comeback in many currencies. However, "gold coin" (in numismatic terminology) always refers to a coin that is (more or less) made of gold, and does not include coins made of manganese brass or other alloys. Furthermore, many countries continue to make legal tender gold coins, but these are primarily meant for collectors and investment purposes and are not meant for circulation.

Large gold coins

In 2007, the Royal Canadian Mint produced a  gold coin with a face value of $1,000,000, though the gold content was worth over $2 million at the time. It was intended as a one-off to promote a new line of Canadian Gold Maple Leaf coins, but after several interested buyers came forward the mint announced it would manufacture them as ordered and sell them for between $2.5 million and $3 million. As of May 3, 2007, there were five orders. One of these coins was stolen when it was on exhibition at the Bode Museum in Berlin.

Austria had previously produced a  diameter 31 kg Philharmonic gold coin with a face value of €100,000.

In 2012 the Royal Canadian Mint produced the first gold coin with a 0.11–0.14 ct diamond. The Queen's Diamond Jubilee coin was crafted in 99.999% pure gold with a face value of $300.

The largest legal-tender gold coin ever produced was unveiled in 2012 by the Perth Mint in Western Australia. Known as the "1 Tonne Gold Kangaroo Coin" and with a face value of one million dollars, it contains one tonne of 9999 pure gold, and is approximately 80 cm in diameter by 12 cm thick.

Collecting

Many factors determine the value of a gold coin, such as its rarity, age, condition and the number originally minted. Most gold coins minted since the late 19th century are worth slightly more than spot price, but many are worth significantly more. Gold coins coveted by collectors include the Aureus, Solidus and Spur Ryal.

In July 2002, a very rare $20 1933 Double Eagle gold coin sold for a record $7,590,020 at Sotheby's, making it by far the most valuable coin ever sold up to that time (a 1794 Flowing Hair Dollar sold for over $10 million in January 2013). In early 1933, more than 445,000 Double Eagle coins were struck by the U.S. Mint, but most of these were surrendered and melted down following Executive Order 6102. Only a few coins survived.

On October 4, 2007, David Albanese (president of Albanese Rare Coins) stated that a $10, 1804-dated eagle coin (made for President Andrew Jackson as a diplomatic gift) was sold to an anonymous private collector for $5 million.

Bullion coins

Precious metals in bulk form are known as bullion, and are traded on commodity markets. While obsolete gold coins are primarily collected for their numismatic value, gold bullion coins today derive their value from the metal (gold) content, and, as such, are viewed by some investors as a "hedge" against inflation or a store of value. 

Many nations mint bullion coins.  According to British HM Revenue and Customs investment coins are generally coins that have been minted after 1800, have a purity of not less than 900 thousandths, or have been legal tender in its country of origin.   Although nominally issued as legal tender, these coins' face value as currency is far below that of their value as bullion.

The European Commission publishes annually a list of gold coins which must be treated as investment gold coins in all EU Member States. The list has legal force and supplements the law. In the United Kingdom, HM Revenue and Customs have added an additional list of gold coins alongside the European Commission list. These are gold coins that HM Revenue & Customs recognise as falling within the exemption for investment gold coins. This second list does not have legal force.

South Africa introduced the Krugerrand in 1967 to cater to this market; this was the reason for its convenient and memorable gold content exactly one troy ounce. It was the first modern, low-premium (i.e. priced only slightly above the bullion value of the gold) gold bullion coin. Bullion coins are also produced in fractions of an ounce typically half ounce, quarter ounce, and one-tenth ounce. 

Bullion coins sometimes carry a nominal face value as legal tender, which is minted on the coin. However, their real value is measured as dictated by their troy weight, the current market price of the precious metal contained, and the prevailing premium that market wishes to pay for those particular bullion coins. The face value is always significantly less than the bullion value of the coin. 

Legal tender bullion coins are a separate entity to bullion gold. One enjoys legal tender status, the latter is merely a raw commodity. Gold has an international currency code of XAU under ISO 4217. ISO 4217 includes codes not only for currencies, but also for precious metals (gold, silver, palladium and platinum; by definition expressed per one troy ounce.

Gold bullion coins usually come in 1oz, oz, oz, oz, and oz sizes. Most countries have one design that remains constant each year; others (such as the Chinese Panda coins) have variations each year, and in most cases each coin is dated. A oz bullion coin is about the same size as a U.S. dime. A 1oz gold bullion coin is about the size of a U.S. half dollar.

Fineness 

Circulating gold coins were usually made of an alloy as other metals are mixed into the coin to make it more durable. Fineness is the actual gold content in a coin or bar and expressed as a "per mil", or thousandths.  For example, a gold ingot or coin identified as being .999 fine will be 999/1000 pure gold, with the other 1/1000 being impurities.

Crown gold is the name given to .9167 (or 22-karat) fine gold used in sovereigns and American Gold Eagles. Meanwhile, the United States have historically struck gold coins with .900 fine gold. Most bullion coins are minted from .999 or finer gold.

Counterfeits

For most of history, coins were valued based on the precious metal they contain. Whether a coin was actually made by the party as claimed was of secondary importance compared to whether it contains the correct amount of metal – that is, correct weight and fineness (purity). Genuine appearance was simply a convenient shortcut to avoid time-consuming tests in everyday transactions.

Gold is denser than almost all other metals, hence hard to fake. A determination of weight and volume is in many cases sufficient to spot forgeries. A coin that is not gold or below the expected fineness will either have the right size but will have a lower than expected weight or it weighs right and will be somewhat larger. Most metals that are of similar or higher density than gold are similarly or more expensive, and were unknown in ancient times (notably the platinum group). During the 19th century platinum was cheaper than gold and was used for counterfeiting gold coins. These coins could be detected by acoustic properties. Only two relatively inexpensive substances are of similar density to gold: depleted uranium and tungsten. Depleted uranium is government-regulated, but tungsten is more commonly available and suited for counterfeiting. Alloying gold with tungsten would not work for several reasons, but tungsten plated with a thin layer of gold is a common type of forgery.

Bullion coin counterfeits (of all types) used to be rare and fairly easy to detect when comparing their weights, colors and sizes to authentic pieces. This is because the cost of reproducing any given coin precisely can exceed the market value of the originals. However, since about 2015 counterfeit coins are "flooding the market at an astonishing rate" and "it's gotten to the point where even people who deal with coins all the time may not be able to recognize a counterfeit coin right away" (American Numismatic Association (ANA), 2016). The coins consist mostly of tungsten plated thinly with gold, have the correct weight, correct or near-correct dimensions and are professionally produced in China.

The weight and dimensions of a coin of .999 fineness such as the Maple Leaf cannot be replicated precisely by a gold plated tungsten core, since tungsten has only 99.74% of the specific gravity of gold. However, forgeries of alloyed gold coins (such as American Gold Eagle or Krugerrand made from a crown gold alloy with 22 karats = .917 fineness) may have the correct weight and dimensions because of the lesser density of the alloy. Such forgeries can be detected testing the acoustic, electric resistance or magnetic properties. The latter method uses the fact that gold is weakly diamagnetic and tungsten is weakly paramagnetic. The effect is weak so that testing requires strong neodymium magnets and sensitive conditions (e.g., a gold coin hanging from 2 m long pendulum or placed on styrofoam floating on water), such tests can be performed without special equipment. Forgeries using gold plated tungsten are also used in counterfeiting of gold bars.

Pirates Biting gold
The rationale for biting a coin was the supposed widespread dissemination of gold plated lead coins in the 19th century. Since lead is much softer than gold, biting the coins is a sensible test for counterfeiting. While fine gold is softer than alloyed gold, and galvanized lead is softer, biting coins can only detect the crudest of forgeries. And all "gold" coins minted for circulation in the UK and America since the Tudor period (1485–1603) contained copper which made them more durable and thus hard to bite.

Biting a coin to determine whether it is genuine or counterfeit is a widespread cliché depicted in many films (like the 1917 The Immigrant), books (like the 1925 L'Or by Blaise Cendrars) and plays (like the 1938 Mother Courage which is set in the Thirty Years' War 1618–1648). According to a 2017 study, the assumed widespread practice of pirates biting into a coin is almost certainly a Hollywood myth.

"The origin of the tradition must therefore be older. In medieval times gold coins were made of the purest gold possible for both prestige and practical reason"

"This cliché might find its origin in the crude testing method used by American prospectors during the 19th century gold rush. They bit the gold nuggets they found to be sure that they were not fool's gold" 

Olympic champions often pose biting their gold medals, even though the medals are no longer made of solid gold. Only at three Olympics (in 1904, 1908 and 1912) were medals made of solid gold, but were also smaller. David Wallechinsky commented in 2012 that "It's become an obsession with the photographers. I think they look at it as an iconic shot, as something that you can probably sell. I don't think it's something the athletes would probably do on their own."

Numismatic fake samples

There are well made counterfeit gold coins in circulation. For example, the St. Gaudens Double Eagle omega counterfeit is infamous for its complexity and has fooled many numismatics experts.

Another example is the US $20 gold coin ("double eagle"), which has raised lettering around its rim. If the coin is uncirculated, the letters will be flat on top. If slightly rounded, and the coin is uncirculated, it is a counterfeit. There are other counterfeit double eagles in which the gold and copper alloy was not thoroughly mixed. These counterfeits will have a slightly mottled appearance.

See also

 Counterfeit
 Gold bar
 Gold as an investment
 Gold standard
 Silver coin
 Palladium coin
 Platinum coin
 History of coins
 Numismatics
 Latin Monetary Union
 Euro gold and silver commemorative coins
 Sycee

References

Further reading
 Robert Friedberg, Gold Coins of the World: From Ancient Times to the Present – An Illustrated Standard Catalogue with Valuations (Coin and Currency Institute, 2003)

External links

US Mint: American Eagle Bullion Coins at the website of the United States Mint, US Department of the Treasury
The Royal Mint: UK bullion coins at the website of The Royal Mint

 
Bullion coins
Coins